KATC-FM (95.1 MHz) is a commercial radio station in Colorado Springs, Colorado. The station has been broadcasting a country music format since 2006 and its on-air moniker is Cat Country 95.1. The station is owned and operated by Cumulus Media, with its studios and offices on Commerce Drive. Its transmitter is located near Cheyenne Mountain State Park. Programming is also heard on 30 watt translator station K285EE at 104.9 MHz in Canon City, Colorado.

KATC-FM features locally hosted country music shows on weekdays.  After dark, it carries two national Nash FM shows, "Nash Nights with Shawn Parr" in the evening and "The Blair Garner Show" overnight. Both are syndicated by co-owned Westwood One.

History
On October 1, 1969, the station first signed on. It was locally owned by Harry Hoth's Pikes Peak Broadcasting Company under the call sign KRDO-FM. It was the sister station to KRDO, which Hoth had first put on the air in 1947, Colorado Springs' second radio station. KRDO-FM broadcast a beautiful music format of instrumental songs, and would later shift to easy listening.

As the easy listening format began to decline due to older demographics, KRDO-FM flipped to a soft adult contemporary format and adopted the moniker "Peak 95.1" in 1994. In 1998, KRDO-FM evolved into Hot AC.

After being purchased by Citadel Broadcasting, the station prepared for a major format switch.  "Cat Country 95.1" began broadcasting on July 1, 2006, stunting by repeatedly playing Brooks & Dunn's "Play Something Country". After several days of stunting, the station began its regular mainstream country programming, featuring a complete air staff. As part of the flip, the longtime KRDO-FM call letters would be changed to KATC-FM. Citadel would revive the “Peak” moniker and AC format in late 2006 on sister station 92.9 FM, under new call letters KKPK. The KRDO-FM call sign was quickly picked up by the News-Press & Gazette Company, to pair with its previous partners, KRDO and KRDO-TV. (The current incarnation of KRDO-FM broadcasts on 105.5 FM.)

Citadel merged with Cumulus Media on September 16, 2011. On October 31, 2014, KATC rebranded as "Nash FM 95.1". The Nash FM moniker is used on numerous Cumulus country stations around the U.S.  KATC returned to the “Cat Country” moniker on April 8, 2020.

Previous logos

References

External links
Cat Country 95.1 Official website

ATC-FM
Country radio stations in the United States
Cumulus Media radio stations
Radio stations established in 1964
1964 establishments in Colorado